Joseph Roland Krehbiel (born December 20, 1992) is an American professional baseball pitcher for the Baltimore Orioles of Major League Baseball (MLB). He previously played in MLB for the Arizona Diamondbacks and Tampa Bay Rays.

Career

Los Angeles Angels
Krehbiel attended Seminole High School in Seminole, Florida. He was drafted by the Los Angeles Angels of Anaheim in the 12th round of the 2011 MLB draft.  He signed with the Angels, and played in their organization from 2011 through part of 2014. During his time with them, he played for the AZL Angels, Orem Owlz, Burlington Bees, and the Inland Empire 66ers.

Arizona Diamondbacks
On July 5, 2014, the Angels traded Krehbiel along with Zach Borenstein to the Arizona Diamondbacks for Joe Thatcher and Tony Campana. He played for the Visalia Rawhide after the trade in 2014. He spent the 2015 season with Visalia. His 2016 season was spent with the Mobile BayBears. He spent the 2017 season with the Jackson Generals and the Reno Aces. He spent the 2017 season back with Reno. 

In 2018, he spent the minor league season with Reno, going 3–3 with a 4.24 ERA in 57 innings. On July 2, 2018, his contract was selected and he was called up to the major leagues for the first time. He appeared in two major leagues games in 2018.

He opened the 2019 season back with Reno. He was designated for assignment on July 31, 2019. He elected free agency on November 7, 2019.

Minnesota Twins
On January 28, 2020, Krehbiel signed a minor league deal with the Minnesota Twins. He became a free agent on November 2, 2020.

Tampa Bay Rays
On February 10, 2021, Krehbiel signed a minor league contract with the Tampa Bay Rays organization that included an invitation to Spring Training. On September 18, 2021, the Rays selected his contract to the active roster.
Krehibel made 1 appearance for the Rays, tossing 1 scoreless inning while striking out 2. On September 19, the Rays designated him for assignment.

Baltimore Orioles
On September 21, 2021, Krehbiel was claimed off waivers by the Baltimore Orioles. Krehbiel appeared in 5 games for the Orioles in 2021, pitching to a 4.91 ERA. He made the opening day roster for the first time in his career in 2022.

References

External links

1992 births
Living people
People from Seminole, Florida
Baseball players from Florida
Major League Baseball pitchers
Arizona Diamondbacks players
Tampa Bay Rays players
Baltimore Orioles players
Arizona League Angels players
Orem Owlz players
Burlington Bees players
Inland Empire 66ers of San Bernardino players
Visalia Rawhide players
Mobile BayBears players
Salt River Rafters players
Jackson Generals (Southern League) players
Reno Aces players
Tigres del Licey players
American expatriate baseball players in the Dominican Republic
Durham Bulls players